This is a list of schools in the London Borough of Newham, England.

State-funded schools

Primary schools

Altmore Infant School
Avenue Primary School
Bobby Moore Academy
Brampton Primary School
Britannia Village Primary School
Calverton Primary School
Carpenters Primary School
Central Park Primary School
Chobham Academy 
Cleves Primary School
Colegrave Primary School
Curwen Primary School
Dersingham Primary School
Drew Primary School
Earlham Primary School
Ellen Wilkinson Primary School
Elmhurst Primary School
Essex Primary School
Gainsborough Primary School
Gallions Primary School
Godwin Junior School
Grange Primary School
Hallsville Primary School
Hartley Primary School
Kaizen Primary School
Keir Hardie Primary School
Kensington Primary School
Langdon Academy
Lathom Junior School
Manor Primary School
Maryland Primary School
Monega Primary School
Nelson Primary School
New City Primary School
North Beckton Primary School
Odessa Infant School
Park Primary School
Plaistow Primary School
Portway Primary School
Ranelagh Primary School
Ravenscroft Primary School
Roman Road Primary School
Rosetta Primary School
Royal Wharf Primary School
St Antony's RC Primary School
St Edward's RC Primary School
St Francis' RC Primary School
St Helen's RC Primary School
St James' CE Junior School
St Joachim's RC Primary School
St Luke's CE Primary School
St Michael's RC Primary School
St Stephen's Primary School
St Winefride's RC Primary School
Salisbury Primary School
Sandringham Primary School
School 21
School 360
Scott Wilkie Primary School
Selwyn Primary School
Shaftesbury Primary School
Sheringham Primary School
Sir John Heron Primary School
Southern Road Primary School
Star Primary School
Tollgate Primary School
Upton Cross Primary School
Vicarage Primary School
West Ham CE Primary School
William Davies Primary School
Winsor Primary School
Woodgrange Infant School

Secondary schools

Bobby Moore Academy
Brampton Manor Academy
Chobham Academy  
Cumberland School
Eastlea Community School
Forest Gate Community School
Harris Science Academy East London
Kingsford Community School
Langdon Academy
Lister Community School
Little Ilford School
London Design and Engineering UTC
Oasis Academy Silvertown
Plashet School
Rokeby School
Royal Docks Academy
St Angela's Ursuline School
St Bonaventure's RC School
Sarah Bonnell School
School 21
Stratford School

Special and alternative schools
Education Links
Eko Pathways
John F Kennedy School
New Directions
Tunmarsh School

Further education
London Academy of Excellence
Newham College of Further Education
Newham Sixth Form College
Newham Collegiate Sixth Form Centre

Independent schools

Primary and preparatory schools
Grangewood Independent School
Jamiah Madaniyah Primary School
UK Community College
Zakariya Primary School

Senior and all-through school
Azhar Academy Girls' School
Hafs Academy
Jasper City School
Learningsure College
Promised Land Academy
Quwwat Ul Islam Girls' School

Special and alternative schools
East London Independent School

References

External links
Schools Directory (London Borough of Newham)

 
Newham